Push It to the Limit may refer to:
Push It to the Limit (Corbin Bleu song), a song by Corbin Bleu
Scarface (Push It to the Limit), a song by Paul Engemann
Push Me to the Limit, a song by Frankie McCoy